is a Japanese footballer currently playing as a forward for Mito HollyHock.

Career statistics

Club
.

Notes

References

1998 births
Living people
Sportspeople from Yamaguchi Prefecture
Association football people from Yamaguchi Prefecture
Fukuoka University alumni
Japanese footballers
Association football forwards
Japan Football League players
J3 League players
Tegevajaro Miyazaki players